Ciarán Cannon (born 19 September 1965) is an Irish Fine Gael politician who has been a Teachta Dála (TD) for the Galway East constituency since 2011. He previously served as a senator for the Progressive Democrats and was the last elected leader of that party. He served as a Minister of State from 2011 to 2014 and again from 2017 to 2020. He served as a Senator from 2007 to 2011, after being nominated by the Taoiseach.

Before entering politics, he was CEO and secretary of the Irish Pilgrimage Trust. In 2002, he was honoured as one of the Galway People of the Year.

Progressive Democrats
As a member of the Progressive Democrats, Cannon was elected to Galway County Council in 2004, to represent the Loughrea local electoral area, with 1,307 first preferences. He was an unsuccessful candidate at the 2007 general election in Galway East. He was nominated by the Taoiseach Bertie Ahern to the 23rd Seanad in 2007.

Cannon was elected as Leader of the Progressive Democrats in April 2008. He was the first leader of the party to sit as a Senator while serving as leader. At his first press conference as party leader, he stated that he believed "there was passion, commitment, talent and knowledge within the PDs' ranks to stage a big comeback".

However, after speculation increased that Noel Grealish, one of the two Progressive Democrat TDs, intended to leave the party, Cannon announced in September 2008 that a party conference would be held on 8 November 2008, at which he would recommend that the party disband. The delegates present at the conference voted by 201–161 to agree with this recommendation.

Fine Gael
On 24 March 2009, Cannon announced his decision to resign the leadership of the PDs and joined Fine Gael the same day. At the 2011 general election, he was one of two Fine Gael TDs elected in Galway East.

On 10 March 2011, he was appointed by the coalition government led by Enda Kenny as Minister of State at the Department of Education and Skills with responsibility for Training and Skills. He was dropped as a minister in a reshuffle on 15 July 2014. At the 2016 general election, he was elected to the third seat in Galway East.

On 20 June 2017, he was appointed by the minority government led by Leo Varadkar as Minister of State at the Department of Foreign Affairs and Trade with responsibility for the Diaspora and International Development.

He called for a "No" vote in the 2018 referendum to allow legislation on abortion.

In 2019, in recognition of his work in education, Cannon was appointed as a UNICEF global champion for education. He is one of seven Generation Unlimited Champions who will advocate worldwide for the development of UNICEF's Gen U programme.

At the 2020 general election, he was elected to the second seat in Galway East. He continued to serve as a minister of state until the formation of a new government on 27 June 2020.

Personal life
Cannon is a musician and songwriter, and recently collaborated with Irish folk singer Seán Keane and others on songwriting projects. One of Cannon's co-compositions, "Nature's Little Symphony", was performed in Dublin by the RTÉ Concert Orchestra as part of the national Cruinniú celebrations on Easter Monday 2017. Both "Nature’s Little Symphony" and another of his compositions "Gratitude" featured on the album "Gratitude" recorded by Seán Keane and the RTÉ Concert Orchestra in 2018. On the 10 August 2018, Cannon played piano with Seán Keane and the RTÉ Concert Orchestra as part of a sold-out performance at the National Concert Hall. In 2019, he composed "An Túr", a short piano instrumental to celebrate the birthday of W. B. Yeats.

In 2021 he was commissioned to compose the soundtrack to a poem by Emily Cullen as part of the national commemoration of the signing of the Anglo-Irish treaty in 1921.

Cannon is also an avid cyclist and cycling safety advocate. He specialises in endurance cycling challenges and on 19 June 2021 he cycled Ireland end to end, a distance of 575 km, in 23 hours and 23 minutes, to raise money for charity.

On 2 July 2021 he was involved in a road traffic collision and suffered serious injuries. On 2 July 2022 he celebrated the first anniversary of the incident by cycling 500 km around the border of County Galway.

References

External links
Ciarán Cannon's page on the Fine Gael website

1965 births
Living people
Fine Gael TDs
Leaders of Progressive Democrats
Local councillors in County Galway
Members of the 23rd Seanad
Members of the 31st Dáil
Members of the 32nd Dáil
Members of the 33rd Dáil
Ministers of State of the 31st Dáil
Politicians from County Galway
Progressive Democrats TDs
Nominated members of Seanad Éireann
Progressive Democrats senators
Ministers of State of the 32nd Dáil
Alumni of Trinity College Dublin